Malaya Nakhalovka was an illegal settlement, which was located within the modern Zheleznodorozhny District of Novosibirsk, Russia. It appeared around 1905.

History
Malaya Nakhalovka arose as a result of unauthorized construction and was located south of the Resettlement Center.

It is designated as a microdistrict on the map of Novosibirsk in 1935.

Nakhalovka almost disappeared during the construction of the Dimitrovsky Bridge in the 1970s.

See also
 Bolshaya Nakhalovka

Bibliography
 Маранин И. Ю., Осеев К. А. Новосибирск: Пять исчезнувших городов. Книга I. Город-вестерн. — Новосибирск: Свиньин и сыновья, 2014. — С. 142–143. — .

External links
 Достопримечательности Новосибирска: легендарная Нахаловка. Вечерний Новосибирск. Attractions of Novosibirsk: the legendary Nakhalovka. Vecherny Novosibirsk. 28.11.2016

Zheleznodorozhny City District, Novosibirsk
Slums in Asia
History of Novosibirsk